In enzymology, a thiol S-methyltransferase is an enzyme that catalyzes the chemical reaction

S-adenosyl-L-methionine + a thiol  S-adenosyl-L-homocysteine + a thioether

Thus, the two substrates of this enzyme are S-adenosyl methionine and thiol, whereas its two products are S-adenosylhomocysteine and thioether.

This enzyme belongs to the family of transferases, specifically those transferring one-carbon group methyltransferases.  The systematic name of this enzyme class is S-adenosyl-L-methionine:thiol S-methyltransferase. Other names in common use include S-methyltransferase, thiol methyltransferase, and TMT.  This enzyme participates in selenoamino acid metabolism.

References

 
 
 

EC 2.1.1
Enzymes of unknown structure